Andrew Willows (born October 1, 1980 in Kingston, Ontario) is a Canadian sprint kayaker who has competed since the mid first decade of the 21st century. He won two medals at the ICF Canoe Sprint World Championships with a silver (K-2 500 m: 2006) and a bronze (K-2 200 m: 2009).

Willows also competed in two Summer Olympics, earning his best finish of sixth in the K-2 500 m event at Beijing in 2008.

References
Canoe09.ca profile

Sports-reference.com profile

1980 births
Sportspeople from Kingston, Ontario
Canadian male canoeists
Canoeists at the 2004 Summer Olympics
Canoeists at the 2008 Summer Olympics
Living people
Olympic canoeists of Canada
ICF Canoe Sprint World Championships medalists in kayak